"The Comforts of Home" is a short story by Flannery O'Connor. It was written in 1960 and published in 1965 in her short story collection Everything That Rises Must Converge. A devout Roman Catholic, O'Connor often used religious themes in her work.

Plot summary 
The main character is Thomas, a history writer who lives with his mother. His mother takes pity on Sarah Ham (who calls herself Star Drake), an unstable young woman who has been arrested and jailed for passing bad checks. Thomas' mother hires an attorney to secure the girl's parole and finds a boarding house where Sarah can live. After Sarah gets kicked out of the boarding house for drunkenness, Thomas’ mother invites the girl to live with them despite her son's objections. After various conflicts, during which Sarah seems to act flirtatiously toward him, Thomas notices that his handgun is missing.  He ultimately persuades the county sheriff to search Sarah's room, hoping that she would then be arrested once the gun was discovered in her possession. Before the sheriff arrives, however, Thomas notices that the gun has been returned. He decides to plant the gun in Sarah's purse in order to get her removed anyway, but while doing so, wakes her up, drawing the attention of his mother. After a squabble he ends up fatally shooting his mother when she jumps in front of Sarah to protect her, encouraged by the orders of his father's ghost. Just after this the sheriff arrives and draws incorrect conclusions that Thomas planned this all along to pin the blame on Sarah.

References

Short stories by Flannery O'Connor
1965 short stories
Southern Gothic short stories